The Runaway Train is the first audio story featuring the Eleventh Doctor and Amy Pond. It is set in the Wild West where the Doctor and Amy race along the railroads.  It is written by Oli Smith and read by Matt Smith.  It was released in a promotion in The Daily Telegraph on 15 May 2010, prior to any commercially released stories.

Featuring 
 Eleventh Doctor
 Amy Pond

2010 audio plays
Audiobooks based on Doctor Who
Eleventh Doctor audio plays
New Series Adventures